No Through Road (alternatively stylised simply as NTR) is a British web series written and directed by filmmaker Steven Chamberlain, who also stars. Considered a foundational work of the analog horror genre, originating from a 2009 short film based on the Bunny Man urban legend, the 1999 supernatural horror film The Blair Witch Project, and the 2008 psychological horror film The Strangers (from which Gillian Welch's "My First Lover" is sampled), which was expanded to a series in mid-2011, the series purports to be footage found in a discarded video camera belonging to four teenagers en-route to Stevenage, as they find themselves trapped in a time loop, pursued by a hatted masked man. With the cast and crew initially being uncredited to maintain the illusion of the footage being real in the early days of online video platforms, the series was aired through to late-2012 on YouTube, going viral and receiving a positive critical reception.

Chamberlain had initially planned for No Through Road to have eight episodes, but had to cut four episodes because of budgetary constraints. He has stated that he is unsure as to whether or not he will continue the series, but that if he did he would prefer to make each episode at least 30 minutes in length. Following a surge in traffic to the original video and web series due to YouTube's algorithm in June 2022, and a further cult following, Chamberlain released a teaser for a potential revival of the series to a new channel.

Synopsis
No Through Road follows footage of several seventeen-year-old boys purportedly found dead in their car ten miles from their hometown. In the series, while driving to Stevenage, after taking a shortcut via a private "no through road" at the abandoned Broomhall Farm at night, and finding a perfectly-preserved rabbit during a rest stop at the side of the road, the boys unwittingly find themselves trapped in a time loop along two road signs marking an intersection between Benington and Watton, while pursued by a mysterious hatted masked man.

Episodes

Short film (2009)

Web series (2011–2012)

Teaser (2022)

Development
In November 2020, Steven Chamberlain publicly revealed himself as the director, writer, and co-star of No Through Road, with his cast and crew having initially remained uncredited to maintain the illusion of the original 2009 short film and 2011–2012 web series continuation being legitimate found footage, only naming one other cast member as Oliver (who portrays the car's driver "Ollie" and main star of the film), with the characters serving as fictionalised versions of themselves (à la The Blair Witch Project). Having made the original film as "a lark with a group of friends when they were all around 17 or 18 [before] realizing that the end result was actually pretty impressive", Chamberlain used it to earn himself a position in the University of Westminster's film program, crediting there as being "a pretty clear path back to No Through Road in terms of any success that I do have currently [in my career]".

Chamberlain was inspired to make the original film in late 2008 when with his friends took to "nighttime drives" through the Stevenage countryside in another's Peugeot Quiksilver, being inspired to create the film after the friend group came across a "relatively well-known" no through road outside Broomhall Farm, remarking upon its "creepiness" and suggesting various "spur-of-the-moment" ideas to his friends, including "that sign that goes towards Benington. What if we can't escape it?” How would [we] all react if they passed the sign once? Twice? Three times? And I'd just press record, we'd drive past it again, and that's what you['d] see in the film". Improvising most of the film, Chamberlain described the "lack of structure, combined with the fact that none of his friends were actors in any sense of the word" as what made the film so "believable", describing it as "sort of like lightning in a bottle – because we weren't planning on [making] it, it has that authenticity", editing together and uploading the film to YouTube (with a musical riff of Gillian Welch's "My First Lover" sampled from The Strangers included at the end) over the following weeks.

Describing The Blair Witch Project as the "unavoidable inspirational thing" behind No Through Road (although not a direct inspiration), Chamberlain elaborated on having been "play[ing] loosely enough with what it was doing that it managed to avoid falling into the trap of an overly-structured narrative [and] comes across as completely and utterly natural. No wonder one of the primary search terms I’ve found people inquiring about over the years isn’t just “No Through Road,” but “Is No Through Road real?”, and that while the majority of the original No Through Road video was shot in that one night, the ending – "the moment the masked figure appears in front of the tunnel, illuminated by the car’s restored headlines" – was filmed as a pickup few weeks later, with Chamberlain playing the masked figure as well as himself, wearing a trench coat, cowboy hat, and drama mask and using bit of "trick editing" to allow himself to appear as two different characters onscreen at the same time.

While intended as "a one-off — a self-contained unit that stood on its own as piece of found footage storytelling", development of a web series sequel began during Chamberlain's university years, casting another friend, Dave, as himself, "operat[ing] the camera throughout [most] of the three follow-ups". Unlike the original film, Chamberlain spent several brainstorming sessions developing a direction for the follow-ups, spending "a lot of evenings drinking beer and writing down ideas, and going, no, that’s too complicated, how can we make this just complicated enough that people might get it, and it would be satisfying, but not answer all the questions" before settling on a time loop as the primary concept, in leading to the "rug-pull, gut-drop moment [in No Through Road 4] when you realize that the car that's turned up is them in the past". While filming the second installment, Chamberlain elected for a slower pace, still "largely improvised [but] a lot more restrained and had a slightly different tone to it[…] seeing how real we could make this feel and how languorous the pace would be if you weren't planning on making a film", envisioning it as a way to make the film "still feel authentic and scrappy", while the third and fourth videos were developed together as a unit, the three follow-ups serving as "very much a sequel[…] planned very much as a separate thing, like, if we can live up to [No Through Road 1], how are we going to do it?” On the fan theories resulting from the series and its meaning, Chamberlain described "the not knowing" as what had given the series such longevity, citing David Lynch and The Blair Witch Project as one of his main cinematic inspirations on depicting "the thing you don’t see", that if "there'ss any kind of reason behind the longevity of No Through Road,’ it'ss because I kind of took that one point on board fairly well".

In a separate interview in March 2022, on learning of the series' retrospective analysis as a foundational work of the analog horror genre (which took off through the 2010s, with No Through Road cited as an inspiration for such works as Kane Pixels' The Backrooms), Chamberlain elaborated on the films having been shot with a MiniDV, mainly from a desire to "test it out" at the age of 17, with the cast being drunk while filming the original, and that while portraying the series' masked figure, that "there were quite a few hairy moments where I had to leap and hide in the hedgerows so that I wasn’t arrested by the police for scaring the crap out of people who were just trying to drive home" due to how he was dressed. On developing the sequel web series, Chamberlain further revealed that the time loop concept had been inspired by the Doctor Who episode "Time", which had then-recently come out, "accidentally manag[ing] to capture the inherent tragedy of people that you like disappearing into a horrible scenario [while] speak[ing] to that fear that we all have.", concluding that "I'm glad that “No Through Road” is continuing to scare the crap out of people [so many] years later".

Reception
Critical reception for No Through Road has been universally positive. On the original video's initial publication, El Gore lauded the filmmakers' "admirable dedication to passing the video off as actual found footage: after an extensive Google search, the El Gore team concluded that there's no information about its production available on the Internet. We have no idea who made this film or who stars in it, which certainly adds to the subliminal creep factor", further complimenting the "acting [a]s excellent, the conversation[s] feel[ing] natural, [and] the tension [being] palpable[:] as good as it gets in the genre and medium", as well as the use of Gillian Welch's "My First Lover" (sampled from the 2008 film The Strangers) as an "infinitely creepy record loop on the radio", alongside other clips added randomly throughout the film, as "greatly enhanc[ing] the eerie atmosphere" of the film, and concluding to describe the "spine-chilling short [as] undoubtedly one of the best low-budget horror films I've [ever] seen".

The Ghost in My Machine lauded No Through Road as "tak[ing] the phrase "hopelessly lost" to a whole new level", with Refinery29 complimenting the series' use of screams, recommending it to be watched to "keep you up at night" with a blanket (to scream into). While recognising the series' "quarter of a shoestring" budget and "deeply bizarre" premise, Film School Rejects nonetheless praised No Through Road as "deliver[ing] some very nice chills", noting the use of a slow burn while complimenting the acting of the films "British teens [as] feel[ing] far less annoying than American ones", concluding to sum up the first installment as "a spooky little film that feels a bit like a campfire tale".

Ranking the series as the 15th of the "16 Best Horror Shows on YouTube" in 2015, The Richest noted Marble Hornets as having taken "clear influence" from No Through Road, praising its inspiration taken from The Blair Witch Project. Bustle described the "weird-o" series as "a masterful example of excellent storytelling done on a tiny budget, exemplifying the fact that you don't need a ton of money to make a really freaky movie", with "the first video [standing] alone quite well" and instilling a feeling of "never want[ing] to drive home at night again".

Ranking the series as the best English Web Series existing as of 2018, Medium lauded the "shocking ending of the first episode" and its "unsettled" feeling, overall describing No Through Road as "a pretty cool and interesting web series that seamlessly weaves into a found footage film".

TREMG described the series as "an absolute must-see if you're a fan of found-footage-style horror", with the "camerawork and acting put into this project [being] extremely impressive, making it worth a watch as you get into the Halloween spirit", with Postize giving the series an 8/10 on their "Disturbance Factor". Ranking the series as the second on their 2021 list of "The Best Original Horror On YouTube", Looper complimented all four installments of No Through Road as "wonderfully creepy videos that will satisfy anyone hungry for horror", with Horror Obsessive praising its "incredibly effective [use of] basically nothing but dialogue and a few spooky shots" throughout the series.

In other media
The audio commentary of the 2012 Canadian supernatural horror film Grave Encounters 2, directed by John Poliquin and written by The Vicious Brothers, credits the film's closing kill — in which a character (Leanne Lapp) is beaten to death with a video camera, from the first-person perspective of the camera — to the filmmakers having seen the same event take place in No Through Road, and having been impressed by the concept enough to adapt it (amongst allusions to several other popular horror films).

On the director's commentary for In Fear, a 2013 British psychological horror film written and directed by Jeremy Lovering, Lovering accredited No Through Road (for which Chamberlain was originally uncredited) as the primary source of inspiration for the film's main plot and premise, which follows a young couple (Iain De Caestecker and Alice Englert) as they find themselves trapped in a loop between two road signs in the Irish countryside at night, while pursued by an unknown masked assailant (Allen Leech).

An unauthorised Swedish language remake of the series, directed by Tobias Ohlsson, was nominated for the "Best Experimental Horror Film Award" at the Oregon Scream Week Horror Film Festival in late 2019.

References

External links
 No Through Road (short film) at IMDb
 No Through Road (web series) at IMDb
 Steven Chamberlain's main channel on YouTube
 Steven Chamberlain's backup channel on YouTube

British web series
British psychological horror films
British supernatural horror films
Found footage films
Horror fiction web series
Improvised films
2009 short films
2009 web series debuts
2011 web series debuts